Athens Lower Village Historic District is a national historic district located at Athens in Greene County, New York. The district contains 267 contributing buildings, including the Jan Van Loon House built in 1706. It includes residential, commercial, and ecclesiastical structures built primarily during the 19th century in a variety of popular architectural styles.

It was listed on the National Register of Historic Places in 1980.

See also
National Register of Historic Places listings in Greene County, New York

References

Historic districts on the National Register of Historic Places in New York (state)
Federal architecture in New York (state)
Historic districts in Greene County, New York
National Register of Historic Places in Greene County, New York